The Open International de Squash de Nantes 2015 is the 2015 edition of the Open International de Squash de Nantes, which is a tournament of the PSA World Tour event Challenger (Prize money: $10,000).

The event took place at Le Lieu Unique in Nantes in France from 2 to 6 of September.

Grégoire Marche won his first Open International de Nantes trophy, beating Henrik Mustonen in the final.

Prize money and ranking points
For 2015, the prize purse was $10,000. The prize money and points breakdown is as follows:

Seeds

Draw and results

See also
PSA World Tour 2015
Open International de Squash de Nantes

References

External links
PSA Open International de Squash de Nantes 2015 website
Open International de Squash de Nantes official website

2015 in French sport
2015 in squash
Open international de squash de Nantes